Marvin Nathaniel Webster (April 13, 1952 – April 4, 2009) was an American professional basketball player. He played one season in the American Basketball Association (ABA) and nine in the National Basketball Association (NBA) with the Denver Nuggets (1975–77), Seattle SuperSonics (1977–78), New York Knickerbockers (1978–84) and Milwaukee Bucks (1986–87). His nickname was The Human Eraser because of his impressive shot blocking talent.

College career
Born in Baltimore, Maryland, the son of a Baltimore preacher, Webster attended Edmondson High School in the city. A four-year basketball letterman at Morgan State University, he earned the nickname "The Human Eraser" as a junior when he averaged eight blocked shots a game while helping the Bears capture the 1974 NCAA Division II Championship. He averaged 21 points and 22.4 rebounds and was named Division II player of the year.

Webster still holds eight career school records: 1,990 points, 2,267 rebounds, 19.5 rebounds per game, 785 field goals made, 424 free throws made, 644 free throws attempted, 722 blocks and 110 games started. His 740 rebounds in 1974 and 2,267 career total are still second all-time in NCAA history in their respective categories. He was named to the NCAA Division II Men's Basketball 50th Anniversary All-Elite Eight Team in 2006.

College statistics

|-
| align="left" | 1971–72
| align="left" | Morgan State
| 26 || - || - || .453 || - || .687 || 16.1 || - || - || - || 13.2
|-
| align="left" | 1972–73
| align="left" | Morgan State
| 28 || - || - || .514 || - || .686 || 23.2 || - || - || - || 18.5
|-
| align="left" | 1973–74
| align="left" | Morgan State
| 33 || - || - || .545 || - || .697 || 22.4 || - || - || - || 21.4
|-
| align="left" | 1974–75
| align="left" | Morgan State
| 27 || - || - || .562 || - || .490 || 17.0 || - || - || - || 15.7
|- class="sortbottom"
| style="text-align:center;" colspan="2"| Career
| 114 || - || - || .524 || - || .658 || 19.9 || - || - || - || 17.5
|}

Professional career
Webster was selected in the first round of both the NBA and ABA Drafts in 1975 (third overall by the Atlanta Hawks, first overall by the Denver Nuggets, respectively). After signing with the Nuggets, he was diagnosed with a form of hepatitis, and played only 38 games as a rookie in 1975–76.

A 7' 1" center, Webster helped the Nuggets win the 1976-77 NBA Midwest Division and the SuperSonics the 1977-78 NBA Western Conference title.  His finest season was his single year with Seattle, in which he averaged 14.0 points, 12.6 rebounds, and 2.0 blocks per game. He raised his performance in the SuperSonics’ 22-game playoff run that year, averaging 16.1 points, 13.1 rebounds, and more than 2.6 blocks per game.  Webster still holds the SuperSonics' record for rebounds in one half with 21.

In 1978, the Knicks signed Webster as a free-agent.  As compensation, the NBA awarded the SuperSonics the playing rights to power-forward Lonnie Shelton and the Knicks’ 1979 first-round draft pick.  In his first season with the Knicks, Webster averaged 11.3 points per game and 10.9 rebounds per game.  Webster never again reached double figures in either category in the NBA after that.  Webster missed the 1984–85 and start of the 1985-86 season with hepatitis before retiring from the Knicks.

Webster played briefly in the Continental Basketball Association, and later with the Milwaukee Bucks during the 1986-87 season.

Webster was found dead in a Tulsa, Oklahoma hotel room on April 4, 2009.  He was 56 years old. It is believed that he died of a coronary artery disease.

Career statistics

ABA

Regular season

|-
| align="left" | 1975–76
| align="left" | Denver
| 38 || - || 10.5 || .458 || .000 || .705 || 4.6 || 0.8 || 0.2 || 1.4 || 4.3
|- class="sortbottom"
| style="text-align:center;" colspan="2"| Career
| 38 || - || 10.5 || .458 || .000 || .705 || 4.6 || 0.8 || 0.2 || 1.4 || 4.3
|}

Playoffs

|-
| align="left" | 1975–76
| align="left" | Denver
| style="background:#cfecec;" | 13* || - || 11.9 || .420 || .000 || .536 || 5.5 || 0.7 || 0.1 || 1.1 || 4.4
|- class="sortbottom"
| style="text-align:center;" colspan="2"| Career
| 13 || - || 11.9 || .420 || .000 || .536 || 5.5 || 0.7 || 0.1 || 1.1 || 4.4
|}

NBA

Regular season

|-
| align="left" | 1976–77
| align="left" | Denver
| 80 || - || 16.0 || .495 || - || .650 || 6.1 || 0.8 || 0.3 || 1.5 || 6.7
|-
| align="left" | 1977–78
| align="left" | Seattle
| 82 || - || 35.5 || .502 || - || .629 || 12.6 || 2.5 || 0.6 || 2.0 || 14.0
|-
| align="left" | 1978–79
| align="left" | New York
| 60 || - || 33.8 || .473 || - || .573 || 10.9 || 2.9 || 0.4 || 1.9 || 11.3
|-
| align="left" | 1979–80
| align="left" | New York
| 20 || - || 14.9 || .481 || .000 || .750 || 4.0 || 0.5 || 0.2 || 0.6 || 4.4
|-
| align="left" | 1980–81
| align="left" | New York
| 82 || - || 20.8 || .466 || .250 || .638 || 5.7 || 0.9 || 0.3 || 1.2 || 5.2
|-
| align="left" | 1981–82
| align="left" | New York
| 82 || 32 || 23.0 || .491 || .000 || .635 || 6.0 || 1.2 || 0.3 || 1.1 || 6.2
|-
| align="left" | 1982–83
| align="left" | New York
| 82 || 0 || 18.0 || .508 || .000 || .589 || 5.4 || 0.6 || 0.4 || 1.6 || 5.4
|-
| align="left" | 1983–84
| align="left" | New York
| 76 || 5 || 17.0 || .469 || .000 || .564 || 4.8 || 0.7 || 0.4 || 1.3 || 3.8
|-
| align="left" | 1986–87
| align="left" | Milwaukee
| 15 || 0 || 6.8 || .526 || 1.000 || .750 || 1.7 || 0.2 || 0.2 || 0.5 || 1.8
|- class="sortbottom"
| style="text-align:center;" colspan="2"| Career
| 579 || 37 || 22.4 || .489 || .333 || .617 || 7.0 || 1.2 || 0.4 || 1.4 || 7.1
|}

Playoffs

|-
| align="left" | 1976–77
| align="left" | Denver
| 6 || - || 16.0 || .500 || - || .667 || 6.7 || 0.5 || 0.3 || 1.8 || 5.0
|-
| align="left" | 1977–78
| align="left" | Seattle
| style="background:#cfecec;" | 22* || - || 41.1 || .489 || - || .675 || 13.1 || 2.6 || 0.3 || 2.6 || 16.1
|-
| align="left" | 1980–81
| align="left" | New York
| 2 || - || 31.5 || .500 || .000 || .000 || 5.0 || 0.5 || 0.0 || 0.5 || 6.0
|-
| align="left" | 1982–83
| align="left" | New York
| 6 || - || 19.2 || .389 || .000 || .636 || 4.7 || 0.5 || 0.0 || 1.2 || 4.7
|-
| align="left" | 1983–84
| align="left" | New York
| 12 || - || 17.0 || .483 || .000 || .600 || 4.7 || 0.3 || 0.3 || 1.4 || 3.1
|- class="sortbottom"
| style="text-align:center;" colspan="2"| Career
| 48 || - || 28.8 || .485 || .000 || .647 || 8.8 || 1.4 || 0.3 || 2.0 || 9.6
|}

Personal life
Webster was married to Mederia Webster.  Webster's son, Marvin Webster Jr., was recruited to play basketball at Temple University, but died at age 19 from a heart attack prior to his sophomore season.

Later in his life, Webster lived in Metuchen, New Jersey.

Popular culture references
Webster is one of five 1970s Seattle SuperSonics players whose names are featured on characters in "The Exterminator," the third episode of Season 1 of iZombie. The other four are Freddie Brown, Gus Williams, Wally Walker and Don Watts.

References

External links
 Latzke, Jeff. "Ex-Sonics star Marvin Webster found dead in hotel," The Associated Press, Wednesday, April 8, 2009.
 Allen, Percy. "Former Sonic Marvin Webster dies at 56," The Seattle Times, Thursday, April 9, 2009.
 Marvin Webster – Sports Illustrated cover, October 16, 1978.
 Kirkpatrick, Curry. "Heavens, What A Year Ahead!" Sports Illustrated, October 16, 1978.
 Pearlman, Jeff. "Catching Up With...SuperSonics center Marvin Webster-May 22, 1978," Sports Illustrated, May 5, 1997. 
 Seattle PI: Photos | Death of Marvin Webster

1952 births
2009 deaths
African-American basketball players
American men's basketball players
Atlanta Hawks draft picks
Basketball players from Baltimore
Centers (basketball)
Denver Nuggets players
Denver Rockets players
Milwaukee Bucks players
Morgan State Bears men's basketball players
New York Knicks players
People from Metuchen, New Jersey
Seattle SuperSonics players
Utah Stars draft picks
20th-century African-American sportspeople
21st-century African-American people